Joseph Johann Baptist Woelfl (surname sometimes written in the German form Wölfl) (24 December 1773 - 21 May 1812) was an Austrian pianist and composer.

Life 

Woelfl was born in Salzburg, where he studied music under Leopold Mozart and Michael Haydn.

He first appeared in public as a soloist on the violin at the age of seven.  Moving to Vienna in 1790 he visited Wolfgang Mozart and may have taken lessons from him. His first opera, Der Höllenberg, appeared there in 1795.

Woelfl was very tall (over 6 feet), and with an enormous finger span (his hand could strike a thirteenth, according to his contemporary Václav Tomášek); to his wide grasp of the keyboard he owed a facility of execution which he turned to good account, especially in his extempore performances.

Although he dedicated his 1798 sonatas op. 6 to Beethoven, the two were rivals. Beethoven however bested Woelfl in a piano 'duel' at the house of Count Wetzlar in 1799, after which Woelfl's local popularity waned. After spending the years 1801 -1805 in Paris, Woelfl moved to London, where his first concert performance was on 27 May 1805. On 12 March 1806 he published "Six English Songs" which he dedicated to the English soprano Jane Bianchi.

In England, he enjoyed commercial if not critical success. In 1808 he published his Sonata, Op. 41, which, on account of its technical difficulty, he entitled Non Plus Ultra; and, in reply to the challenge, a sonata by Dussek, originally called Le Retour à Paris, was reprinted with the title Plus Ultra, and an ironic dedication to Non Plus Ultra. He also completed for publication an unfinished sonata of George Pinto.

Woelfl died in Great Marylebone Street, London, on 21 May 1812. He is buried in St. Marylebone Churchyard.

His music was championed and performed by Romantic composers like Schubert, Chopin and Liszt.

Recordings
Woelfl's works have long disappeared from the concert repertory. However, in 2003 four selected piano sonatas of his (Op. 25 and Op. 33) were recorded by the pianist Jon Nakamatsu (Harmonia Mundi CD # 907324). (An Adda CD in 1988 contained his three opus 28 sonatas, played by Laure Colladant, who also recorded the sonatas opus 6 for Adès in 1993 and the three opus 33 sonatas for the label Mandala in 1995.) In 2006, German pianist Yorck Kronenberg recorded Woelfl's piano concertos 1, 5 and 6 in addition to a movement from the piano concerto 4. The piano concertos closely resemble the later piano concertos of Mozart, who had pioneered the genre; they can be distinguished from Mozart's works by the larger range of the piano, which had been extended shortly after Mozart's death. Nataša Veljkovic has since recorded the 2nd and 3rd Piano Concertos and the  Concerto da Camera in E flat major (1810) on CPO.

There are also now recordings of the two symphonies (Pratum Integrum Orchestra, 2008), three string quartets (Quatuor Mosaïques, 2012), and the Grand Duo for cello and piano. Toccata Classics has issued two CDs of the piano music (2017 and 2021). In 2021, Dutch pianist Mattias Spee recorded an album with works by Joseph Woelfl with record label TRPTK.

Works

Piano Concertos
Piano Concerto No. 1 op. 20 in G major (ca 1802-1803)
Piano Concerto No. 2 op.26 (published c.1806)
Piano Concerto No. 3 op.32 in F major
Piano Concerto No. 4 op. 36 in G major "The Calm" (published c.1808)
Piano Concerto No. 5 op. 43 in C major "Grand Military Concerto" (1799?)
Piano Concerto No. 6 op. 49 in D major "The Cuckoo" (published 1809)

Symphonies
Symphony in G minor Op. 40.' Dedicated to Luigi Cherubini.Parts and movement breakdown @ the Moravian Music Foundation - see . This work is rather larger in dimensions (320+ bars in each of first movement and finale) than Woelfl's Op. 41.Symphony in C major Op. 41.' Dedicated to Johann Peter Salomon. Parts available at the Moravian Music Foundation - see . 
IMSLP has an autograph manuscript of an 1807 "Symphony No.3" by Woelfl (in one movement, or one movement of a larger work.)
A publication ca.1825 was made of 3 "Grand Symphonies" by Wölfl. (The British Library record does not give an opus number.)
The Moldenhauer archive has (in manuscript, though possibly not autograph) part of what is described as "J. Woelfl's 5th grand sinfonia : for full band".

String Quartets
3 String Quartets Op. 4 dedicated to Leopold Staudinger
String Quartets Op. 5 (3 or more?)
6 String Quartets Op. 10. Dedicated to Count Moritz Fries.
3 String Quartets Op. 30. Dedicated to Mr. Bassi Guaita.
Six String Quartets op.51. Published by Lavenu in London.

Operas

Der Höllenberg (Freihaus-Theater 1795), Libretto by E. Schikaneder
Das schöne Milchmädchen, oder Der Guckkasten (1797)
Der Kopf ohne Mann (1798)
Liebe macht kurzen Prozess, oder Heirat auf gewisse Art (1798)
Das trojanische Pferd (1799)
L'Amour romanesque (1804)
Fernando, ou Les maures (1805)

Other works
68 Sonatas for the piano, several sonates for piano and violin, 18 piano trios, and some 4-hands music
Grand Duo in D minor for Pianoforte and Violoncello op. 31. Dedicated to Madame Hollander
Clarinet concerto in B major (premiered 1796)
 Variations, rondoós, German dances...

Thematic catalogue (Werkverzeichnis) and Biography
 Margit Haider-Dechant: Joseph Woelfl. Verzeichnis seiner Werke. Apollon-Musikoffizin Vienna 2011
 Margit Haider-Dechant: Art. Wölfl, Joseph. In: Die Musik in Geschichte und Gegenwart. Zweite, neubearbeitete Ausgabe, hrsg. von Ludwig Finscher, Personenteil Bd. 17, Kassel u. a., 2008, pp. 1122–1128.

References

 Opera Glass
 Discogs

External links
 Joseph Woelf biography, St Marylebone Parish Church
 
 

1773 births
1812 deaths
18th-century Austrian musicians
18th-century Austrian male musicians
19th-century Austrian musicians
19th-century Austrian male musicians
18th-century classical composers
19th-century classical composers
18th-century classical pianists
19th-century classical pianists
Austrian classical composers
Austrian opera composers
Male opera composers
Composers for piano
Austrian male classical composers
String quartet composers
Burials at St Marylebone Parish Church
Austrian classical pianists
Male classical pianists
Austrian expatriates in France
Austrian expatriates in England
Composers from Salzburg